Muhu (also called Muhumaa in Estonian), is an island in the West Estonian archipelago of the Baltic Sea. With an area of  it is the third largest island belonging to Estonia, after Saaremaa and Hiiumaa.

Together with neighbouring smaller islands of Kesselaid, Viirelaid, Võilaid and Suurlaid it forms Muhu Parish, the rural municipality within Saare County.

History and geography
The German names for the island are Mohn and Moon. Moon is also the Swedish name for the island.

The most important villages in Muhu are Kuivastu, Liiva (where the school can be found) and Koguva. In Pädaste, an internationally renowned luxury hotel and spa operates in the restored manor house.

The island is divided from mainland Estonia by the Suur Strait (Moonsund) and from Saaremaa by the Väike Strait. It is linked by ferry to Virtsu in the mainland, and to Saaremaa by a causeway, the Väinatamm.  In winter an ice road connects the island to the mainland.

In January 1227, an army of the Livonian Brothers of the Sword with Letts, Germans of Riga and native Livonians (20,000 men commanded by William of Modena) crossed on sea ice from the mainland and attacked the island of Saaremaa to reduce the last holdout of pagan Estonians. This ended the Estonian Crusade.

The Battle of Karuse or Battle on the Ice was fought on 16 February 1270 between the Grand Duchy of Lithuania and the Livonian Order on the frozen Baltic Sea between the Muhu Island and the mainland. The Lithuanians achieved a decisive victory. The battle, named after the Karuse village, was the fifth-largest defeat of the Livonian or Teutonic Orders in the 13th century.

The same waters saw the Battle of Moon Sound in September–October 1917 between Russian and German naval forces.

Muhu is also famous for having the only still-working traditional windmills in Estonia.

Muhu is the home of Estonia's first wine tourism farm – Luscher & Matiesen Muhu Winehouse.

Gallery

See also
Municipalities of Estonia
List of municipalities of Estonia
List of islands of Estonia

External links

Official website
Muhu Tourism Association
Muhu Island in Jetsetter Top10
Photos about Muhu.

 Muhu
Estonian islands in the Baltic
Gulf of Riga